Erwin Lang (born 22 July 1886 – 10 February 1962) was an Austrian painter. His work was part of the painting event in the art competition at the 1928 Summer Olympics.

Life 
Erwin Lang was born in Vienna, the son of the social worker and women's rights activist Marie Lang, and studied at the Vienna School of Arts and Crafts under Alfred Roller. He exhibited his works for the first time in 1908 at the Vienna Art Show. In 1911 Lang exhibited with Kokoschka and Schiele in an exhibition of the Hagenbund, of which he was a member. Another of his main areas was woodcuts.

References

Further reading
 Das frühe Plakat (Deutschland). 1980, p. 172
 Fuchs: Maler 1881–1900. Band 1. p. 151
 Allgemeines Künstlerlexikon. Bio-Bibliographischer Index. Band 6. 2000, p. 50
 Lang, Erwin. In: Hans Vollmer (ed.): Allgemeines Lexikon der Bildenden Künstler von der Antike bis zur Gegenwart. Begründet von Ulrich Thieme und Felix Becker. Band 22: Krügner–Leitch. E. A. Seemann, Leipzig 1928, p. 314
 Erwin Lang. In: Hans Vollmer (ed.): Allgemeines Lexikon der bildenden Künstler des XX. Jahrhunderts. Band 3: K–P. E. A. Seemann, Leipzig 1956, pp. 165 f.
 Wilhelmi: Künstlergruppen. 1996, p. 171

External links
Benezit Dictionary of Artists: Lang, Erwin (subscription required)

1886 births
1962 deaths
Austrian male painters
Olympic competitors in art competitions